Kristīne Vītola (born 2 June 1991) is a Latvian basketball player for TTT Riga and the Latvian national team.

She participated at the EuroBasket Women 2017.

University of Texas at El Paso statistics 

Source

References

External links

1991 births
Living people
Olympiacos Women's Basketball players
Fenerbahçe women's basketball players
Galatasaray S.K. (women's basketball) players
Latvian expatriate basketball people in Poland
Latvian expatriate basketball people in Spain
Latvian expatriate basketball people in Turkey
Latvian expatriate basketball people in the United States
Latvian women's basketball players
Power forwards (basketball)
Basketball players from Riga
UTEP Miners women's basketball players